Owch Bolagh or Owchbolagh or Uch Bolagh or Uchbolagh, also rendered as Auch Bulaq or Uchbulak, may refer to various places in Iran:
 Owch Bolagh, Bileh Savar, Ardabil Province
 Owch Bolagh, Germi, Ardabil Province
 Owch Bolagh, Kowsar, Ardabil Province
 Owch Bolagh, Namin, Ardabil Province
 Owch Bolagh, East Azerbaijan
 Owchbolagh, East Azerbaijan
 Owch Bolagh, Kurdistan
 Owch Bolagh, Zanjan
 Owch Bolagh, Khodabandeh, Zanjan Province